Wo Lok Estate is a public housing estate in Kwun Tong, Kowloon, Hong Kong. It is the oldest existing public housing estate in Kwun Tong District, and the first public housing estate with seven-storey blocks. It comprises 11 blocks of buildings of Old Slab type built from 1962 to 1966. It was developed into 2 phases. Phase 1 included 8 seven-storey blocks built in 1962 and 1963, while Phase 2 included 3 blocks built in 1965 and 1966.

Background
In 2007, the Hong Kong Government evaluated the condition of the buildings, and found them all structurally sound. However, structural repair and improvement works were carried out to sustain the buildings for the next 15 years.

Houses

Demographics
According to the 2016 by-census, Wo Lok Estate had a population of 4,381. The median age was 48.8 and the majority of residents (98.2 per cent) were of Chinese ethnicity. The average household size was 2.3 people. The median monthly household income of all households (i.e. including both economically active and inactive households) was HK$16,000.

Politics
Wo Lok Estate is located in Po Lok constituency of the Kwun Tong District Council. It is currently represented by Cheng Keng-ieong, who was elected in the 2019 elections.

Education
Wo Lok Estate is in Primary One Admission (POA) School Net 48. Within the school net are multiple aided schools (operated independently but funded with government money) and Kwun Tong Government Primary School.

See also

Public housing estates in Kwun Tong

References

Residential buildings completed in 1962
Residential buildings completed in 1963
Residential buildings completed in 1965
Residential buildings completed in 1966
Kwun Tong
Public housing estates in Hong Kong